Mark Chittenden (born 12 July 1956) is a British judoka.  He competed in the men's half-heavyweight event at the 1980 Summer Olympics.  He became champion of Great Britain, winning the middleweight division at the British Judo Championships in 1977.

References

1956 births
Living people
British male judoka
Olympic judoka of Great Britain
Judoka at the 1980 Summer Olympics
Sportspeople from Southend-on-Sea